Sakshi Shivanand is an Indian actress, who has appeared in Telugu, Tamil, Kannada, Malayalam and Hindi films. Her most notable work is Aapko Pehle Bhi Kahin Dekha Hai which was directed by Anubhav Sinha and co-starred Priyanshu Chatterjee, Om Puri and Farida Jalal. She has also lent her voice to Cinderella in The Story of Cinderella, a popular animation television series which was telecast in India on Just Kids! on Sahara TV.

Shivanand made her debut in Bollywood in 1996. During her early career, she starred in the Aditya Pancholi-starrer Zanjeer (1998). She later shot to fame within a short span of time in Tollywood. Her debut in Telugu was with Chiranjeevi in the film Master. Later, she acted opposite many top Telugu cinema heroes such as Nagarjuna in Seetharamaraju, Balakrishna in Vamsoddharakudu, Rajasekhar in Simharasi, Mahesh Babu in Yuvaraju, Abbas in Rajahamsa and opposite Mohan Babu in Yamajathakudu and Collector Garu. She performed an item song in the 2008 film Homam which was directed by J.D. Chakravarthy.

She has a younger sister Shilpa Anand, who is a television actress.

Filmography

References

External links 
 

Indian film actresses
Actresses in Telugu cinema
Actresses in Tamil cinema
Living people
Kannada people
Actresses in Kannada cinema
Actresses in Hindi cinema
Actresses from Mumbai
20th-century Indian actresses
21st-century Indian actresses
Actresses in Malayalam cinema
Year of birth missing (living people)